The southern puffer (Sphoeroides nephelus) is a species of pufferfish in the family Tetraodontidae. It is found in the Caribbean Sea, and possibly further south on the coast of Brazil.

References

External links
 

Tetraodontidae
Fish described in 1882
Fish of the Atlantic Ocean
Fish of Cuba
Fish of the Dominican Republic